The 1990 Copa Libertadores Finals was the two-legged final to decide the winners of the 1990 Copa Libertadores, the 31st edition of the Copa Libertadores, South America's premier international club football tournament organised by CONMEBOL.

The finals were contested in two-legged home-and-away format between Paraguayan club Olimpia and Ecuadorian club Barcelona. The first leg was hosted by Olimpia at the Estadio Defensores del Chaco in Asunción, Paraguay on 3 October 1990, while the second leg was hosted by Barcelona at the Estadio Monumental in Guayaquil, Ecuador on 10 October 1990.

Olimpia won the final 3–1 on aggregate for their second Copa Libertadores title. As winners, they earned the right to play against the winners of the 1989–90 European Cup, Italian club Milan, in the 1990 Intercontinental Cup in Tokyo, Japan. They also had earned the right to play against the winners of the 1990 Supercopa Libertadores in the 1991 Recopa Sudamericana. However, as Olimpia also went on to win the Supercopa Libertadores, they were automatically awarded the Recopa Sudamericana title. Olimpia also automatically qualified for the knockout stage of the 1991 Copa Libertadores.

Format
The final was planned to be played on a home-and-away two-legged basis. The team that accumulated the most points – two for a win, one for a draw, zero for a loss – after the two legs was crowned champion. If the two teams had tied on points after the second leg, extra time would not be played, and a penalty shoot-out would be used to determine the winner.

Qualified teams

Venues

Match details

First leg

Second leg

See also
 1991 Recopa Sudamericana

References

1990
October 1990 sports events in South America
Club Olimpia matches
Barcelona S.C. matches
1990 in Paraguayan football
1990 in Ecuadorian football
Sports competitions in Asunción
Sports competitions in Guayaquil
1990 Copa Libertadores Finals
1990 Copa Libertadores Finals
International club association football competitions hosted by Paraguay
International club association football competitions hosted by Ecuador